Modern Language Review is the journal of the Modern Humanities Research Association (MHRA). It is one of the oldest journals in the field of modern languages. Founded in 1905, it has published more than 3,000 articles and 20,000 book reviews.

Modern Language Review is published four times a year (in January, April, July and October). All articles are in English and their range covers the following fields:

 English (including United States and the Commonwealth)
 French (including Francophone Africa and Canada)
 Germanic (including Dutch and Scandinavian)
 Hispanic (including Latin-American, Portuguese, Catalan, and Galician)
 Italian
 Slavonic and East European Studies
 General Studies (including linguistics, comparative literature, and critical theory)

History
The first issue was published in October 1905 with John G. Robertson as the founding editor-in-chief. When Robertson died in 1933, he was replaced by Charles Jasper Sisson.

Sources
Modern Language Review page on the MHRA website

References

Linguistics journals
English-language journals
Quarterly journals
Publications established in 1905
1905 establishments in the United Kingdom